"Love Is Just Around the Corner" is a popular song with music by Lewis E. Gensler and lyrics by Leo Robin, published in 1934. It was introduced in the 1934 Bing Crosby film Here is My Heart and was also included in the 1935 film Millions in the Air.

Crosby recorded the song on November 9, 1934 with Georgie Stoll and his Orchestra for Decca Records and it reached the No. 8 position in the USA charts of the day. He recorded the song again in 1954 for his album Bing: A Musical Autobiography.

The song has become a standard, recorded by many artists. Early recordings were made by Bing Crosby in 1934 and Robert Cummings the next year.

Other recordings
June Christy - The Uncollected June Christy, Vol II (1957), A Friendly Session, Vol. 2 (1999) with the Johnny Guarnieri Quintet
Alma Cogan - With Love in Mind (1988)
Billy Eckstine - Billy Eckstine's Imagination (1958)
Duke Ellington - Up in Duke's Workshop (1979)
Jackie Davis - Hammond Gone Cha-Cha (1959) (rereleased on Ultra Lounge/Organs in Orbit) (1996)
Don Fagerquist - I Had the Craziest Dream (1955); Portrait of a Great Jazz Artist (1957)
Firehouse Five Plus Two - Plays for Lovers (1956)
The Four Freshmen - 4 Freshmen and 5 Trombones (1955)
Harry James
Harry James and His New Jazz Band, Vol. 2 (Mr. Music MMCD 7012, 1956 [2002])
Swingin' N' Sweet (Giants of Jazz Productions GOJ LP-1009, [1978])
Vic Damone - Vocals by Vic Damone (1952)
George Shearing - Jazz Masters 57 (1953)
Paul Anka - Swings for Young Lovers (1960)
Frank Sinatra - Sinatra and Swingin' Brass (1962)
Jo Jones - Smiles (1969)
Michael Holliday - Mike (1962)
The Platters - Song for the Lonely (1962)
Mel Tormé- An Evening at Charlie's (1983)
Kenny Rogers - Timepiece (1994)
Michael Feinstein - Such Sweet Sorrow (1995)
Charlie Ventura - Bop for the People'' (2002)

References

Songs with lyrics by Leo Robin
1934 songs